Edward T. Bruyette (August 31, 1874 – August 5, 1940) was an outfielder in Major League Baseball. He played for the Milwaukee Brewers in 1901.

Bruyette was born in Manawa, Wisconsin, and began his professional baseball career in 1900 in the International League. In 1901, he was acquired by the Brewers' player-manager Hugh Duffy and played in 26 major league games in August and September. He batted a minuscule .183, and his fielding percentage as an outfielder was .778 (8 errors in 36 chances). The following season, Bruyette was back in the minors with the Minneapolis Millers and Helena Senators. After his baseball career ended, he was a grading foreman in a packing plant. He died in Peshastin, Washington, at the age of 65.

References

External links

1874 births
1940 deaths
People from Manawa, Wisconsin
Major League Baseball outfielders
Milwaukee Brewers (1901) players
Hamilton Hams players
Port Huron Tunnelites players
Minneapolis Millers (baseball) players
Helena Senators players
Baseball players from Wisconsin
Nashville Vols players
Aberdeen Pippins players